János Komlós may refer to:

 János Komlós (mathematician)
 János Komlós (writer)